Monte Avaro is a mountain located within the Bergamo Alps of Lombardy, Italy.  It is located in the upper Val Brembana in the province of Bergamo.

Mountains of the Alps
Mountains of Lombardy